New Brunswick Public Schools is a comprehensive community public school district that serves students in pre-kindergarten through twelfth grade in New Brunswick, in Middlesex County, New Jersey, United States. The district is one of 31 former Abbott districts statewide that were established pursuant to the decision by the New Jersey Supreme Court in Abbott v. Burke which are now referred to as "SDA districts" based on the requirement for the state to cover all costs for school building and renovation projects in these districts under the supervision of the New Jersey Schools Development Authority.

As of the 2018–19 school year, the district, comprising 11 schools, had an enrollment of 10,422 students and 781.8 classroom teachers (on an FTE basis), for a student–teacher ratio of 13.3:1.

The district is classified by the New Jersey Department of Education as being in District Factor Group "A", the lowest of eight groupings. District Factor Groups organize districts statewide to allow comparison by common socioeconomic characteristics of the local districts. From lowest socioeconomic status to highest, the categories are A, B, CD, DE, FG, GH, I and J.

Schools
Schools in the district (with 2018–19 enrollment data from the National Center for Education Statistics) are:
Elementary schools
Lincoln Annex School (747 students; in grade 4-8)
Michael Chiodo, Principal
Lincoln Elementary School (544; K-3)
JoAnn Kocis, Principal
Livingston Elementary School (434; K-5)
Nadine Sanchez, Principal
Lord Stirling Elementary School (560; PreK-5)
Ellen Treadway, Principal
McKinley Community Elementary School (761; PreK-8)
Janene M. Rodriguez, Principal
Kevin Jarido, Interim Principal
A. Chester Redshaw Elementary School (1,012; PreK-5)
Iris Castillo, Principal
Paul Robeson Community School For The Arts (665; K-8)
Violet Robinson, Principal
Roosevelt Elementary School (733; K-5)
Gisela Ciancia, Principal
Woodrow Wilson Elementary School (416; PreK-8)
William Smith, Principal
Middle school
New Brunswick Middle School (1,167; 6-8)
Georgette Gonzalez Lugo, Principal
High schools
New Brunswick High School (2,206; 9-12)
Kenneth Redler, Principal
New Brunswick Health Sciences Technology High School (9-12; NA)
Jeremiah Clifford, Principal
New Brunswick P-TECH
Michael W. Fanelli, Principal
Other schools
New Brunswick Adult Learning Center
Tim Timberlake, Principal

Administration
Core members of the district's administration are:
Dr. Aubrey A. Johnson, Superintendent
Richard Jannarone, Business Administrator / Board Secretary

Board of education
The district's board of education, comprised of nine members, sets policy and oversees the fiscal and educational operation of the district through its administration. As a Type II school district, the board's trustees are elected directly by voters to serve three-year terms of office on a staggered basis, with three seats up for election each year held as part of the April school election. The board appoints a superintendent to oversee the district's day-to-day operations and a business administrator to supervise the business functions of the district. As one of the 13 districts statewide with school elections in April, voters also decide on passage of the annual school budget.

Before 2012, the members of the Board of Education were appointed by the city's mayor.

Notes

References

External links
New Brunswick Public Schools
 
School Data for the New Brunswick Public Schools, National Center for Education Statistics

New Brunswick, New Jersey
New Jersey Abbott Districts
New Jersey District Factor Group A
School districts in Middlesex County, New Jersey